The Battle of Pasewalk was a battle at Pasewalk of the Seven Years' War between Swedish and Prussian forces fought on October 3, 1760.

The Prussian force of 4,200 men under Paul von Werner were attempting to seize Pasewalk where a Swedish force of 1,700 men under Augustin Ehrensvärd were stationed. After two failed attacks on the town and several skirmishes outside, the Prussian force, after seven hours of fighting, retreated as the night approached. 

Casualties on both sides were severe, as Sweden had suffered 500 men in losses, many of them captured by Prussian troops taking the nearby redoubts. However, the Prussians suffered 300 men lost while attempting to storm the main Swedish army at Pasewalk.

References 

1760 in Prussia
1760 in Sweden
Battles in Mecklenburg-Western Pomerania
Pasewalk
Pasewalk
Battles of the Seven Years' War
Conflicts in 1760